Ronald Rosenbaum (born November 27, 1946) is an American literary journalist, literary critic, and novelist.

Life and career
Rosenbaum was born into a Jewish family in New York City, New York and grew up in Bay Shore, New York. He graduated from Yale University in 1968 and won a Carnegie Fellowship to attend Yale's graduate program in English Literature, though he dropped out after taking one course. He was an editor of The Fire Island News and then wrote for The Village Voice for several years, leaving in 1975 after which he wrote for Esquire, Harper's, High Times, Vanity Fair, New York Times Magazine and Slate.

Rosenbaum spent more than ten years doing research on Adolf Hitler including travels to Vienna, Munich, London, Paris, and Jerusalem, interviewing leading historians, philosophers, biographers, theologians and psychologists. Some of those interviewed by Rosenbaum included Daniel Goldhagen, David Irving, Rudolph Binion, Claude Lanzmann, Hugh Trevor-Roper, Alan Bullock, Christopher Browning, George Steiner, and Yehuda Bauer. The result was his 1998 book, Explaining Hitler: The Search for the Origins of His Evil.

In Explaining Hitler, Ron Rosenbaum also recounted in detail the previously little-reported story of the efforts of anti-Hitler journalists at the Munich Post who, from 1920 to 1933, published repeated exposés on the criminal activities of the National Socialist German Workers Party (i.e. the Nazis). Matthew Ricketson, coordinator of the Journalism program at RMIT University's School of Applied Communication in Melbourne, Australia, called this book "a brilliant piece of research".

In 1987 he began writing a weekly column for the New York Observer called "The Edgy Enthusiast". He currently writes a column for Slate called The Spectator.  In 2009 one of Rosenbaum's Spectator columns was a lengthy sardonic critique of pop music icon Billy Joel entitled "The Worst Pop Singer Ever" which in turn was met with widespread derision as rank snobbery by many of Joel's fans, including some pop music critics and cultural observers, who felt the critique was unfair and contrived and not becoming of its author.

In The Shakespeare Wars he discussed recent controversies among literary historians, actors, and directors over how the works of William Shakespeare should be read, understood, and produced.

His most recent book is How the End Begins: The Road to a Nuclear World War III, which discusses the paradoxes of deterrence, the danger of nuclear proliferation, and whether the bomb comprises an "exceptionalist" argument about warfare and genocide.

In December 2015 Rosenbaum published the article "Thinking the Unthinkable",  in which he expresses his view that there exists a frightening possibility that Israel might not survive as a nation. In it he claims that "The Palestinians want a Hitlerite Judenrein state, however much violence it takes to accomplish it. Not separation, elimination." The Palestinians are, he asserts, engaged in incessant state and religious incitement to murder Jews. The "stabbing intifada" is not an insurgency, but a matter of "the ritual murder of Jews". Whereas Hitler tried to hide his crimes, the Palestinians celebrate killing Jews.

Bibliography

Books
The Secret Parts of Fortune (2011)

How the End Begins: The Road to a Nuclear World War III
Explaining Hitler: The Search for the Origins of His Evil
Travels with Dr. Death and Other Unusual Investigations (1991)

Articles
 

 "Against Normalization: The Lesson of the 'Munich Post, Los Angeles Review of Books, 5 February 2017

See also
List of Adolf Hitler books
The Secret History of Hacking, a 2001 documentary film featuring Rosenbaum.

References

External links

Complete Slate Spectator archive
New York Observer
 To aid researchers, author Ron Rosenbaum has allowed the scanning of Explaining Hitler at Amazon.com
Reviews of The Hitler Of History by John Lukacs & Explaining Hitler: The Search For The Origins Of His Evil by Ron Rosenbaum
Excerpt: The Shakespeare Wars on CBC Words at Large
Audio interview with Rosenbaum on How the End Begins
Phillip Nobile and Ron Rosenbaum, "The Curious Aftermath of JFK's Best and Brightest Affair," New Times, July 7, 1976, pp. 22–33.

1946 births
American columnists
American male journalists
Jewish American writers
21st-century American historians
21st-century American male writers
Living people
People from Bay Shore, New York
Yale University alumni
Smithsonian (magazine) people
Historians from New York (state)
American male non-fiction writers
21st-century American Jews